Wang Hui (born 28 November 1976) is a Chinese former wrestler. He won a bronze medal at the 1998 Asian Games, competing in Men's Greco-Roman 54 kg. He also competed in the 2000 Summer Olympics.

References

External links
 

1976 births
Living people
Chinese male sport wrestlers
Olympic wrestlers of China
Wrestlers at the 1998 Asian Games
Wrestlers at the 2002 Asian Games
Wrestlers at the 2000 Summer Olympics
Asian Games bronze medalists for China
Medalists at the 1998 Asian Games
Sportspeople from Anhui
Asian Games medalists in wrestling
21st-century Chinese people
20th-century Chinese people